Room For Abuse '06 is a re-release of Ska Punk band Spunge's  2000 album Room for Abuse. It has been re-mastered to improve the quality. The CD includes a bonus DVD which is a re-release of their earlier video "Skankin 'N' Skulkin". "Kickin' Pigeons" is also added as an extra 17th track.

Track listing
"Live Another Day" - 3:04
"Get Along" - 2:35
"Break Up" - 3:44
"No Woman No Cry" - 4:26
"All Gone Wrong" - 3:31
"Dubstyle" - 4:16
"Wake Up Call" - 2:57
"Disco Kid" - 4:12
"All She Ever Wants" - 5:25
"Ego" - 3:06
"Second Rate" - 3:14
"Nothing to Hide" - 3:39
"Go Away" - 3:20
"Rockabilly" - 3:24
"Santeria" (originally by Sublime) - 3:48
"Room for Abuse" - 5:05
"Kickin' Pigeons" - 2:37

2006 albums
Spunge albums